The Relief Society is a philanthropic and educational women's organization of the Church of Jesus Christ of Latter-day Saints (LDS Church). It was founded in 1842 in Nauvoo, Illinois, United States, and has more than 7 million members in over 188 countries and territories. The Relief Society is often referred to by the church and others as "one of the oldest and largest women's organizations in the world."

Mission
The motto of the Relief Society, taken from 1 Corinthians 13:8, is "Charity never faileth." The purpose of Relief Society reads, “Relief Society helps prepare women for the blessings of eternal life as they increase faith in Heavenly Father and Jesus Christ and His Atonement; strengthen individuals, families, and homes through ordinances and covenants; and work in unity to help those in need.”

History

Beginnings 
In the spring of 1842 Sarah Granger Kimball and her seamstress, Margaret A. Cook, discussed combining their efforts to sew clothing for workers constructing the Latter Day Saints' Nauvoo Temple. They determined to invite their neighbors to assist by creating a Ladies' Society. Kimball asked Eliza R. Snow to write a constitution and by-laws for the organization for submission to President of the Church Joseph Smith for review. After reviewing the documents, Smith called them "the best he had ever seen" but said, "this is not what you want. Tell the sisters their offering is accepted of the Lord, and He has something better for them than a written constitution. ... I will organize the women. .. after a pattern of the priesthood."

Twenty Latter Day Saint women gathered on Thursday, March 17, 1842, in the second-story meeting room over Smith's Red Brick Store in Nauvoo to discuss the formation of a Ladies' Society with Smith, John Taylor, and Willard Richards. Smith, Taylor, and Richards sat on the platform at the upper end of the room with the women facing them. "The Spirit of God Like a Fire Is Burning" was sung, and Taylor opened the meeting with prayer. The women present were Emma Hale Smith, Sarah M. Cleveland, Phebe Ann Hawkes, Elizabeth Jones, Sophia Packard, Philinda Merrick, Martha McBride Knight, Desdemona Fulmer, Elizabeth Ann Whitney, Leonora Taylor, Bathsheba W. Smith, Phebe M. Wheeler, Elvira A. Coles (Cowles; later Elivira A. C. Holmes), Margaret A. Cook, Athalia Robinson, Sarah Granger Kimball, Eliza R. Snow, Sophia Robinson, Nancy Rigdon and Sophia R. Marks. The women present were proposed as the initial members and the men withdrew as the motion to accept all present was considered. The motion was passed and the men returned. Then another seven names were proposed by Joseph Smith for admission. They were: Sarah Higbee, Thirza Cahoon, Keziah A. Morrison, Marinda N. Hyde, Abigail Allred, Mary Snider, and Sarah S. Granger. The men again withdrew as the women considered and passed the motion. Smith then proposed the society elect a presiding officer and allow that officer to choose two counselors to aid her. They would be ordained and would preside over the society. In the place of a constitution the presidency would preside and all their decisions should be considered law and acted upon as such. At appropriate times, the body of the society should vote and the majority opinion of the sisters would be honored as law. The minutes of the meetings would serve as an additional guide to their governance. Whitney motioned and it was seconded that Emma Smith be chosen president and this passed unanimously. Emma Smith then chose her two counselors, Cleveland and Whitney. At that time Taylor, who had been presiding over the meeting, vacated that honor to Smith and her counselors. The men then again withdrew as Smith chose a secretary and treasurer. The three members of the Presidency were then ordained and blessed by Taylor.

Smith stated "the object of the Society—that the Society of Sisters might provoke the brethren to good works in looking to the wants of the poor—searching after objects of charity, and in administering to their wants—to assist; by correcting the morals and strengthening the virtues of the female community, and save the Elders the trouble of rebuking; that they may give their time to other duties, &c., in their public teaching."

It was proposed that the organization go by the name "Benevolent Society" and with no opposition the vote carried. However, Emma Smith made a point of objection. She convinced the attendees that the term "relief" would better reflect the purpose of the organization, for they were "going to do something extraordinary," distinct from the popular benevolent institutions of the day. After discussion, it was unanimously agreed that the fledgling organization be named "The Female Relief Society of Nauvoo". Joseph Smith then offered five dollars (worth $ today) in gold to commence the funds of the Society. After the men left the room, Eliza R. Snow was unanimously elected as secretary of the Society with Phebe M. Wheeler as Assistant Secretary and Elvira A. Coles as Treasurer. Emma Smith remarked that "each member should be ambitious to do good" and seek out and relieve the distressed. Several female members then made donations to the Society. The men returned, and Taylor and Richards also made donations. After singing "Come Let Us Rejoice," the meeting was adjourned to meet on the following Thursday at 10 o'clock. Taylor then gave a closing prayer. Of his experience Joseph Smith recorded: "I attended by request, the Female Relief Society, whose object is the relief of the poor, the destitute, the widow and the orphan, and for the exercise of all benevolent purposes. ... [W]e feel convinced that with their concentrated efforts, the condition of the suffering poor, of the stranger and the fatherless will be ameliorated".

The new organization was popular and grew so rapidly that finding a meeting place for such a large group proved difficult. Under Emma Smith's direction, the Society was "divided for the purpose of meeting" according to each of the city's four municipal wards. Smith and her counselors continued to preside over the groups. Visiting committees were appointed to determine needs in each ward. Young mother Sarah Pea Rich, wife of Charles C. Rich, recalled, "We then, as a people were united and were more like family than like strangers." By March 1844, membership totaled 1331 women.

The last recorded meeting of the Relief Society in Nauvoo was held on March 16, 1844. Smith had often used the Relief Society as a pulpit to express her opposition to plural marriage. However, several of the society's members and leaders were themselves secretly in plural marriages, including to Smith's own husband, who himself counseled the society against exposing iniquity. These inner conflicts led Joseph Smith to suspend all meetings of the organization. After the death of Joseph Smith in June 1844, Brigham Young assumed leadership of the majority of Latter Day Saints. Desiring to continue plural marriage, Young disbanded the Relief Society before leaving Nauvoo for the Salt Lake Valley.

Moving west 

When Relief Society secretary Eliza R. Snow joined the Latter Day Saints in their exodus west in 1846, she carried the Relief Society Book of Records with her. Although they no longer met in an official capacity, women continued to assemble informally; the care and nurture of the needy continued without a formal Relief Society organization.

As Saints established homes in the Salt Lake Valley and surrounding settlements, formal meetings for women gradually emerged. A Female Council of Health was established in 1851. On January 24, 1854, in response to Brigham Young’s call to Saints to assist neighboring Native Americans, women from several Salt Lake City wards decided to organize "a society of females for the purpose of making clothing for Indian women and children." Two weeks later, on February 9, 1854, they formally organized an association remembered as the "Indian Relief Society." Matilda Dudley was elected president and treasurer, Mary Hawkins and Mary Bird as counselors, Louisa R. Taylor as secretary, and Amanda Barnes Smith as assistant secretary. Twelve other women were listed as charter members. Though the Latter-day Saint women were poor in material goods, they felt the need of Native Americans exceeded their own. Over the next four months, their efforts to clothe Indian women and children continued in earnest. In June 1854, Brigham Young encouraged women to form societies in their individual wards. Members of the first Indian Relief Society disbanded to help establish organizations in their own wards, many of them becoming leaders. Matilda Dudley, for example, became president of the Thirteenth Ward Relief Society with Augusta Cobb and Sarah A. Cook as her counselors and Martha Jane Coray as secretary. Records are limited but show that by 1858 over two dozen organizations had formed in some twelve Salt Lake City wards and in other outlying settlements such as Ogden, Provo, Spanish Fork, and Manti, Utah.

Each Relief Society operated independently within its ward in cooperation with the local bishop. Ward societies were not interconnected by central women's leadership, though many of them engaged in similar activities such as sewing clothing for Indians, caring for the poor, especially emigrants, and weaving carpets for local meetinghouses. 
  
In 2004, historian Carol Holindrake Nielson documented the organization, activities and membership of the Salt Lake City Fourteenth Ward Relief Society. The Fourteenth Ward included Temple Square and eleven residential squares to the south and west. This section contained the homes of many church leaders. Among others, the ward Relief Society roll included the names of Leonora Taylor and Jane B. Taylor, wives of John Taylor; Elizabeth B. Pratt, Kezia D. Pratt and Phoebe Soper Pratt, wives of Parley P. Pratt; and Phebe W. Woodruff, Emma Woodruff, Sarah Woodruff, Sarah Delight Woodruff, Phebe A. Woodruff, Susan C. Woodruff, Bulah Woodruff, wives and daughters of Wilford Woodruff.

Interrupted by the 1858 Utah War, no more than three or four of these independent ward organizations survived the temporary move of much of the Latter-day Saint population south of Salt Lake County.

Reorganization and expansion 

In December 1867 church president Brigham Young publicly called for the reorganization of Relief Society in every ward. Eliza R. Snow provided a historical account of the society and described its purpose to seek "not only for the relief of the poor, but the accomplishment of every good and noble work." Young again addressed the need to establish local Relief Society units at the church's 1868 April general conference, stating: Now, Bishops, you have smart women for wives, many of you. Let them organize Female Relief Societies in the various wards. We have many talented women among us .... You will find that the sisters will be the mainspring of the movement. Snow was assigned to assist local bishops in organizing permanent branches of the Relief Society. Using the minutes recorded in the early Nauvoo meetings as a Constitution, Snow created a standard model for all local wards that united women in purpose and provided a permanent name and structure to their organization. She and nine other sisters began visiting wards and settlements in 1868, and at the end of the year, organizations existed in all twenty Salt Lake City congregations and in congregations in nearly every county in Utah.

Ward units of the Relief Society performed a variety of functions. Women helped the bishop of the ward assist the poor by collecting and disbursing funds and commodities. They nursed the sick, cleaned homes, sewed carpet rags for local meeting houses, planted and tended gardens, promoted home industry, and shared doctrinal instruction and testimony.

Snow provided central leadership both before and after her call as General President in 1880. She emphasized spirituality and self-sufficiency. The Relief Society sent women to medical school, trained nurses, opened the Deseret Hospital, operated cooperative stores, promoted silk manufacture, saved wheat, and built granaries. In 1872, Snow provided assistance and advice to Louisa L. Greene in the creation of a woman's publication, the Woman's Exponent, which was loosely affiliated with the Relief Society. Emmeline B. Wells succeeded Greene and continued as editor until its final issue in 1914.

Under Snow's direction, Relief Society sisters nurtured young women and children. Heeding Brigham Young's 1869 call to reform, Snow, Mary Isabella Horne, and others established the Ladies' Cooperative Retrenchment Association from which the Young Ladies' Department of the Ladies' Cooperative Retrenchment was formed (later called the Young Ladies' Mutual Improvement Association and now the Young Women). Snow also worked with Aurelia Spencer Rogers to establish the first ward Primary Association in 1878. By 1888, the Relief Society had more than 22,000 members in 400 local wards and branches. In 1891, the Relief Society became a charter member of the National Council of Women of the United States and it was called the National Women's Relief Society.

Early Relief Society meetings were generally held semi-monthly. One meeting per month was devoted to sewing and caring for the needs of the poor. At meetings members might receive instruction, discuss elevating and educational topics, and bear testimony. The women were also encouraged to explore and develop cultural opportunities for their community.

The 20th century
Stakes began circulating outlines for lessons in 1902. The first standardized lessons were published by the General Board in 1914 in the Relief Society Bulletin, later renamed the Relief Society Magazine in 1915.

By 1942, membership in the organization was approximately 115,000 women, growing to 300,000 members in 1966.

In June 1945, the General Board changed the organization's official name to "Relief Society of The Church of Jesus Christ of Latter-day Saints".

The church-wide implementation of Priesthood Correlation in the 1960s "radically transformed" the Relief Society. These changes assisted in preparing the Relief Society for an era of a worldwide church; correlated lessons and materials were easier to translate and applicable to a broader audience. A side-effect of these changes was that the Relief Society lost much of the autonomy that it once enjoyed, notably around its budget.

The Relief Society Magazines last edition was December 1970, after which it and several other church magazines were replaced with the Ensign.

In April 2005, the Relief Society received the American Red Cross "Heroes 2004 Award" for its service in the Greater Salt Lake area. In 2010, Catholic Community Services honored Julie Beck, the general president of the Relief Society, where she was named Community Partner.

Structure and meetings today
In the LDS Church today, every Latter-day Saint woman, on her eighteenth birthday or within the following year, and women under 18 who are married, move into Relief Society from the Young Women. Additionally, unwed teenage mothers who are seventeen or older and who choose to keep the child are advanced into Relief Society. There are no fees or membership dues for joining the Relief Society.

In each local congregation of the church, a member of the Relief Society serves as the local president of the organization. The president selects two other women from the congregation to assist her as counselors; together the three women make up the local Relief Society presidency. The Relief Society presidency acts under the direction of the bishop or branch president in presiding over and serving the women in the congregation. Additionally, stake or district Relief Society presidencies exist to supervise five or more local Relief Society presidencies.

Following changes made in 2019, Relief Society holds meetings twice per month that last approximately fifty minutes. During these meetings, an educational lesson is presented by a member of the Relief Society presidency or another woman who has been asked to serve as the instructor. From 1997 to 2016, the curriculum was composed primarily of Teachings of Presidents of the Church. As of 2019, recent general conference messages largely comprise the curriculum. The Relief Society also leads the LDS Church's efforts to teach basic literacy skills to those members and non-members that lack them.

According to the church, as of February 2020, the Relief Society has over 7 million members in 188 countries and territories, having grown from about 6 million in 170 territories in 2009.

Governance
Three women are selected by the First Presidency to serve the entire LDS Church as the General Relief Society Presidency. Although these women are not considered general authorities, they are based in Salt Lake City and are considered to be "general officers" of the church and are the highest ranking women in the LDS Church's hierarchy. Similar to other general authorities and officers in the church, they serve under the direction of the church's First Presidency. Since August 2022, the General Relief Society Presidency has been composed of Camille N. Johnson, president; J. Anette Dennis, first counselor; and Kristin M. Yee, second counselor. They are assisted and advised by a Relief Society Advisory Council drawn from women in the church.

From the 1970s to 2013, the Relief Society held a general meeting in Salt Lake City, annually in late September, which was broadcast around the world via television and radio, and later the Internet. This meeting was an opportunity for the General Relief Society Presidency to address the entire body of the Relief Society. Typically, a member of the church's First Presidency also spoke to the women of the church.

In 2014, such meetings (along with the March General Young Women Meeting) were replaced by a biannual women's meeting held in March and September, one week before the other sessions of general conference. The meeting is for all women of the church ages eight and older. The first of these meetings was held in March 2014 and the general presidents of the Primary, Young Women, and Relief Society General Presidencies spoke along with Henry B. Eyring of the First Presidency. Beginning in 2018, the annual Women's Session of the church's general conference is held in October, in the evening, as part of the regular Saturday schedule.

Relief Society Building

In Salt Lake City, the Relief Society occupies its own headquarters building known as the Relief Society Building''', which is separate from the other administrative offices of the LDS Church. While the Quorum of the Seventy had a building in Nauvoo in the 1840s, the Relief Society is the only auxiliary organization in the LDS Church today which has a completely separate facility. This building is also the closest of any building to the door of the Salt Lake Temple.

Programs

Ministering sisters

In every LDS congregation, each member of the Relief Society is paired with another member; this companionship is then assigned by the Relief Society Presidency to be ministering sisters of one or more other members of the Relief Society. Ministering sisters strive to make regular contacts with the women assigned to them. Sometimes this contact is a personal visit in the member's home. If this is not possible, the member may be contacted by telephone, letter, e-mail, or a visit in a location other than the member's home. Ministering sisters are encouraged to look for opportunities to serve the individuals to whom they minister.

On April 1, 2018, during the church's general conference, church president Russell M. Nelson announced that the similar program of visiting teaching, along with the priesthood's home teaching, would be retired, to be replaced with the "ministering"-brethren-and-sisters program, with its dual components under the direction of the ward's elders quorum and Relief Society's respective leaderships.

Compassionate service
Along with the bishop or branch president, the Relief Society President is the key person in the ward in ensuring that the temporal and emotional needs of the members of the congregation are met. The Relief Society Presidency is responsible for helping the women of the congregation learn welfare principles such as work, self-reliance, provident living, personal and family preparedness, and compassionate service of others. In many congregations, the Relief Society will ask a woman to serve as the Compassionate Service Leader, who is responsible for organizing service activities and responses to members' needs in times of emergency or hardship.

Activity/enrichment meetings
An evening Relief Society meeting is usually held quarterly on a week-night in each congregation of the church. At this meeting women learn a variety of skills, participate in service projects, and enjoy time together. Local congregations may also choose to hold monthly or weekly meetings for women with similar needs and interests. These extra meetings are informal, and local congregations have a wide discretion in determining what activities will be part of these meetings. These meetings were originally called "Homemaking", and on January 1, 2000, the name changed to "Home, Family, and Personal Enrichment", or "Enrichment" for short. In September 2009, due to the complexity of the name and different interpretations of the meeting's purpose, the separate name for the extra weekday meetings was discontinued and all meetings of the Relief Society began to be referred to simply as "Relief Society meetings".

See also

Family Services
Mormon feminism
Worship services of The Church of Jesus Christ of Latter-day Saints

 References 

 Further reading 
 Derr, Jill Mulvay, Maureen Ursenbach Beecher, and Janath Cannon, Women of Covenant: The Story of Relief Society. Salt Lake City, Utah: Deseret Book, 1992.
 Derr, Jill Mulvay et al. (eds.) The First Fifty Years of Relief Society: Key Documents in Latter-day Saint Women's History. Salt Lake City, UT: Church Historian's Press, 2016.
 Nielson, Carol Holindrake. The Salt Lake City 14th Ward Album Quilt, 1857: Stories of the Relief Society Women and Their Quilt. University of Utah Press, Salt Lake City, Utah, 2004.
 Peterson, Janet and Gaunt, LaRene. Elect Ladies: Presidents of the Relief Society. Salt Lake City, UT: Deseret Books, 1990.
 Relief Society, Charity Never Faileth: History of Relief Society, 1842-1966, Deseret Book: Salt Lake City, Utah, 1966.
 Scott, Patricia Lyn and Linda Thatcher, editors. Women in Utah History: Paradigm or Paradox?'' Utah State University Press, Logan, Utah, 2005. .

External links
 
Nauvoo Relief Society Minute Book at Joseph Smith Papers website
Relief Society General Presidents, Relief Society, Serving in the Church, LDS Church - a list of biographies available about each of the General Presidents of the Relief Society of the LDS Church

 
Christian women's organizations
Religious organizations established in 1842
Religious service organizations
Women's organizations based in the United States
1842 establishments in Illinois
History of women in Utah
International women's organizations
Organizations (LDS Church)
Social welfare charities based in the United States